Radio broadcasting began in New Zealand in 1922, and is now dominated by almost thirty radio networks and station groups. The Government has dominated broadcasting since 1925, but through privatisation and deregulation (in 1989) has allowed commercial talk and music stations to reach large audiences. New Zealand also has several radio stations serving Māori tribes, Pacific Island communities, ethnic minorities, evangelical Christians and special interests.

State-owned broadcaster Radio New Zealand reaches the broadest range of listeners with bilingual flagship broadcaster Radio New Zealand National. Several previously state-owned radio brands like top-rating talk station Newstalk ZB are now owned by NZME Radio, which operates eight networks on terrestrial radio and iHeartRadio. Ten radio networks are operated by MediaWorks New Zealand, including top-rating music stations The Edge and The Rock. Independent stations like The SkiFM Network, 1XX and Coast FM continue to serve local communities, alongside low-powered and internet stations.

New Zealand was also one of the first countries to introduce Christian radio, with Rhema Media now operating three networks around the country. The Student Radio Network began with the start of bFM in 1969 and the first of the country's community access broadcasters was founded in 1981. Te Māngai Pāho funds Māori iwi radio stations, and the Pacific Media Network continues to receive Government support.

History

Early radio

Professor Robert Jack made the first broadcast in New Zealand from the University of Otago physics department on 17 November 1921. The first radio station, Radio Dunedin, began broadcasting on 4 October 1922, but it was only in 1925 that the Radio Broadcasting Company (RBC) began broadcasts throughout New Zealand.

In 1930, station 1ZR began operating from the Queen Street premises of Lewis Eady Limited in Auckland. Pioneer broadcasters included Aunt Daisy, Dudley Wrathall and Rod Talbot. A "radio church", the 'Friendly Road', was run by 'Uncle Tom' Garland and the Reverend Colin Scrimgeour.

In 1932, RBC's assets were acquired by the government, which established the New Zealand Broadcasting Board (NZBB). This would later be replaced by the New Zealand National Broadcasting Service (NBS) and the National Commercial Broadcasting Service (NCBS). In the 1950s, these merged to become the New Zealand Broadcasting Service (NZBS), a government department. In 1962, this gave way to the New Zealand Broadcasting Corporation (NZBC), an independent public body modelled on the BBC in the UK.

Until the 1980s, stations used a series of New Zealand call signs, consisting of a single digit and two letters (see right). In addition to YA National programme stations, YC Concert programme stations and a limited number of privately owned X stations, several stations were operated commercially by the government. In each region, the largest city was assigned a ZB station (1ZB Auckland, 2ZB Wellington, 3ZB Christchurch and 4ZB Dunedin) and a ZM music station (1ZM Auckland, 2ZM Wellington and 3ZM Christchurch). The Newstalk ZB and ZM brands continue to be used by NZME (formerly The Radio Network). The second largest city was assigned a ZA station: 1ZA in Taupo, 2ZA in Palmerston North, 3ZA in Greymouth and 4ZA in Invercargill. In other towns and cities the final letter was assigned from the town or city name such as 4ZG in Gore and 1ZH in Hamilton. These ZA and other stations, also now owned by NZME, were rebranded as Classic Hits and rebranded again in 2014 as The Hits. 1YA, 2YK, 3AQ, 4YA were the first stations operating in the country's four main cities, and 5ZB was a mobile radio station broadcast in railway carriages during the 1940s.

As part of the Geneva Frequency Plan of 1975, the country switched from 10 kHz to 9 kHz channel spacing on the AM band on 23 November 1978.

The Government deregulated the broadcasting market in 1989, and the number of private stations grew exponentially as a result. Most were locally owned and operated, but eventually became part of the Mediaworks group of stations, and by 2004 the majority of former privately owned stations had been rebranded (see below) and owned by the one company.

FM broadcasting

New Zealand's original FM broadcasting allocation, until 1986 was 89.0 to 94.0 MHz, and then from 1986, until 2000 was 89.0 to 101.0 MHz. Meanwhile, the segments of the band not used for FM broadcasting, such as the band above 101 MHz had been had been allocated to land-based AM mobile radio-telephone users (taxis, fire and others), an allocation that dates back to the late 1950s. New Zealand's FM frequency allocation issue was not fixed until the late 1990s, after those users had been progressively reassigned channels elsewhere, when the band was expanded to the full 20 MHz. New Zealand now uses the standard global allocation of 88–108 MHz for FM. NZ permits Radio Data System subcarriers, but their adoption is not universal. While Radio NZ National uses RDS for its FM network from the start, commercial radio's adoption of the technology is increasing.

The first station to broadcast on FM in New Zealand was a temporary station in Whakatane called FM 90.7. The station ran from 5 January 1982 until 31 January 1982. The first permanent station in New Zealand to broadcast on FM was Magic 91FM in Auckland broadcasting on 91.0FM followed by 89 Stereo FM broadcasting on 89.4FM. Both stations are no longer in operation; Magic 91 is the local Auckland frequency for ZM and 89 Stereo FM today broadcasts a simulcasted FM version of Newstalk ZB. Radio New Zealand started broadcasting on FM in the early 1980s and most networks now broadcast on FM. On 22 February 1982, Victoria University of Wellington's student station Radio Active became the first station in Wellington to legally broadcast on FM.

Pirate radio

From 1966, Radio Hauraki broadcast from the MV Tiri that was moored in international waters near Auckland, and in 1968 from the MV Tiri II. This was the only ship-based pirate station to ever broadcast in the Southern Hemisphere which it did for 1,111 days, although it was subsequently discovered that the ship had always been moored in the New Zealand territorial waters off the Hauraki Gulf.

In 1970 it was granted a license to broadcast from land and a successor company still broadcasts to the Auckland market under the Radio Hauraki brand and is networked nationwide. In 1972, Radio Bosom broadcast briefly until Post Office inspectors found and seized the transmitter which was concealed in a maintenance tunnel under a University of Auckland building. Now known as bFM, the station broadcasts legally from the University of Auckland student union building.

Kiwi Radio began broadcasting as 4YZW on 1977, and as WKNZ on the medium wave band in 1978. On 25 March 1980 they launched a pirate Radio Freedom broadcast on both shortwave and FM. In 1983, the name was changed to Kiwi Radio, due to not wanting to be confused with the many other stations named Radio Freedom. Kiwi Radio was known to relay other pirates, such as some from Australia, before it ceased broadcasting in 1997. In 2013, Radio Totse began broadcasting on shortwave to North America on 6925 kHz.

Public radio

Radio New Zealand

Radio New Zealand is a New Zealand's state-owned national public service radio broadcasting service. It was formed in 1925, and took on its modern form under the Radio New Zealand Act 1995. The broadcaster is bound by the Charter and Operating Principles included in the Act, which is reviewed by the New Zealand Parliament every five years and was last amended in 2004. The broadcaster is required to provoke debate and critical thought, reflect New Zealand and Māori cultural diversity, cater for varied ages and interests, promote music and drama and create a sense of national identity. It is also a Civil Defence broadcaster.

Radio New Zealand National, formerly National Radio, is Radio New Zealand's general public service broadcaster. It broadcasts flagship news programmes like Morning Report, Midday Report and Checkpoint, alongside morning show Nine to Noon, afternoon show The Panel and a range of interviews and magazine programmes. Radio New Zealand Concert is FM radio network broadcasting classical and jazz music and regular news updates. The playlist is among the most diverse and eclectic of the world's state run classical music networks. Other services offered by Radio New Zealand include the Radio New Zealand International Pacific shortwave service, the AM Network Parliamentary broadcaster and The Wireless youth website.

Iwi Radio Network

Te Whakaruruhau o Ngā Reo Irirangi Māori is a Māori radio network of bilingual English and Māori language radio stations serving local Māori iwi through local frequencies and online streaming. The individual stations are all funded by and accountable to Te Māngai Pāho. They broadcast national and local news coverage, music, educational programming, comedy, drama and programmes that teach the Māori language, with local personalities, community shows and shared network programmes.

Pacific Media Network

The Pacific Media Network is a pan-Pasifika national broadcasting group owned and operated by the National Pacific Radio Trust and funded by New Zealand on Air. It has a legislative role of serving Pacific peoples and communities in English and ten Pacific languages, in a way that shapes the country's national identity. It also aims to "empower, encourage and nurture Pacific cultural identity and economic prosperity in New Zealand, to celebrate the Pacific spirit". Its primary source of income is a $3.25 million annual grant from the Government. Pacific Media includes the nationwide Niu FM radio network set up in 2002, the Auckland-based Radio 531pi station launched in 1993, and the independent Pacific Radio News service.

Access Radio Network

The Association of Community Access Broadcasters represents the twelve community radio stations set-up between 1981 and 2010 which have received government funding since 1989. They broadcast community programming and provide facilities, training and on-air time for individuals and community groups to produce programming. The stations are also required to represent particular religions, cultures, languages, ages and sexualities. There are currently local access stations in Auckland, Waikato, Taranaki, Hawke's Bay, Manawatu, Wairarapa, Kapiti, Wellington, Nelson, Canterbury, Otago and Southland.

Student Radio Network

The Student Radio Network (known as bNet between 1998 and 2009) is a loose grouping of the current and former student radio stations. These radio stations broadcast local independent news and current affairs, and have provided a platform for new or independent New Zealand artists. The network has co-operated on advertising sales, collaborated on ideas and shared original programming. Some stations are run by student associations while others are owned by independent non-profit trusts. The 2011 Canterbury earthquake and the introduction of voluntary student membership have raised fresh concerns about the future of student broadcasting, but the role of the stations continues to be recognised by New Zealand on Air and the Ministry for Culture and Heritage.

The network began as a grouping of university student radio stations in major centres, and for a while operated as a commercial network of student union stations and former student union stations in six markets. In 1986 member station Radio One launched the Rad-One Card, a low-cost discount and loyalty card with on-air competitions, to raise funds. Similar schemes have now been launched by other stations, such as the Active card by Radio Active and the bCard by bFM and Bank of New Zealand. It adopted the name bNet for over a decade, using the brand of Auckland member station bFM, and held the bNet NZ Music Awards between 1998 and 2007 to promote the role the stations played in fostering New Zealand music across genres. However, the group agreed to change its name back to Student Radio Network at a meeting in 2009, to reflect the broader range of student radio brands. The stations continue to provide a spotlight for local bands, having previously helped promote Fat Freddys Drop, Kora, Jordan Reyne, Dimmer, Jet Jaguar, Shocking Pinks, The Enright House and some underground and electronica acts.

In 1986 the Weird Culture, Weird Custom compilation was released with twelve tracks on the album, two chosen by competition by each of the six member stations. Artists included Jean-Paul Sartre Experience, Putty in Her Hands, and Cassandra's Ears. It was distributed by Jayrem Records. Freak The Sheep Vol. 2 was another similar compilation album released by Flying Nun Records in 1992.

Private radio

Central Media Group (Ski FM Network)
The Ski FM Network is New Zealand's largest independent Top 40 radio network, wholly privately owned and operated. 
From studios in Ohakune, the program audio is fed to the network via high speed fiber to Whanganui on 93.6 FM, Ohakune 106.2 FM, Ruapehu/Turoa 91.8, National Park/Whakapapa 105.4, Rotorua 90.0 FM, Taihape 107FM, Taumarunui 91.1, Taupo 87.8 FM, and online via Tune-In, iHeart Radio and www.skifmnetwork.co.nz. 
Originally established in the early 80's as a niche market platform, the brand has seen a few owners over the years and since 2012 the current owners have solidified additional frequencies for use around New Zealand at a later date for additional brands and content. An additional 12 frequencies have been secured for future expansion. 
The Ski Brand has a regional coverage which includes a population footprint of 135,772 plus the Summer and Winter visitor population spikes, it allows their advertisers to buy at provincial rates and receive metropolitan sized audiences. Currently, with no need for segmented markets, advertisers find the return on investment for full network placement works exceptionally well.

New Zealand Media and Entertainment
New Zealand Media and Entertainment is one of New Zealand's largest radio companies. It was formed in 2014 through the formal merger of The Radio Network and the New Zealand assets of APN News & Media, which includes magazines and newspapers like The New Zealand Herald. The Radio Network, in turn, began when the commercial radio activities of Radio New Zealand were sold-off in 1996, putting the Sports Roundup service and the Newstalk ZB, Classic Hits and ZM networks into entirely private ownership.

The company now runs talk radio network Newstalk ZB and sports radio network Radio Sport alongside music networks Radio Hauraki, Coast, Flava, The Hits and Mix.  Privately owned Gore station Hokonui Gold is operated by NZME under a long-term lease contract.

MediaWorks New Zealand
MediaWorks New Zealand operates ten radio brands alongside its television brands, TV3 and FOUR. It was formed in 2004 when CanWest Global Communications combined television company TV3 Network Services and radio company RadioWorks, to sell-down its shares in the company on the NZSX and sell its remaining stake to Ironbridge Capital. MediaWorks has continued to face ongoing financial difficulties, requiring a $43 million loan from the Government in 2011 before briefly going into receivership in 2013. Since Mark Weldon took charge of the company in August 2014, it has outlined plans for greater integration between radio and television. This includes the planned introduction of a combined news service, NewsHub, in 2016.

Since its inception in 2004, MediaWorks has relaunched local heritage stations to its adult contemporary More FM and easy listening The Breeze brands, reducing or removing local programming. Its other music brands include The Edge, The Rock and The Sound. It has rolled out new talk radio network Radio Live and local music station Kiwi FM, converted Radio Pacific to LiveSport, and purchased brands Mai FM and George FM. MediaWorks affiliates include Times FM in Orewa, Coromandel FM on the Coromandel Peninsula, Radio Dunedin in Otago and Port FM in Timaru.

Rhema Media
Rhema Media is the country's largest Christian media organisation, and a major New Zealand radio company. Christchurch evangelist Richard Berry first proposed Radio Rhema in the 1960s, and it began permanently broadcasting in 1976. Rhema Media is the founding organisation of United Christian Broadcasters and provides the model of broadcasting for member organisations in other countries. For example, Australia's Rhema FM is modelled on New Zealand's Rhema.

The organisation is predominantly funded by donations, and operates young-oriented Life FM, family-oriented Rhema and Star for older listeners. The future of some of its networks was brought into question in 2010, when the Government required Rhema Media to raise 6.4 million dollars to renew its commercial radio frequencies for the following two decades.

Brian FM
Broadcasting to Marlborough, Nelson, Whanganui, Taihape, Timaru, Oamaru, Ashburton, Alexandra and Cromwell.  The station does not use DJ's, instead plays music with short ad libbed commercials.

The Wolf

The Wolf was a short-lived radio network based at Lake Tekapo in South Canterbury. The station was independently owned from its outset in 2001, and broadcast to rural areas where in some cases the larger network stations did not broadcast or operate local stations. The network started at a time when many New Zealand stations had been taken over by New Zealand's two largest radio companies The Radio Network and MediaWorks New Zealand or replaced with a network product based from one of the main centres, particularly Auckland. Due to funding issues, it went off the air permanently in 2003.

The network broadcast on 100.6 FM in several centres, including Temuka, Blenheim, Kaikōura, Methven, Waimate, Oamaru, Alexandra, Gore, Mount Cook Village, Reefton, Geraldine, Twizel, Fairlie, Murchison, Timaru, Westport, Hanmer Springs and Karamea. It also broadcast on 91.9 FM in Hokitika, 97.8 FM in Lake Tekapo, 99.0 FM in Kapiti Coast, 105.4 FM in Auckland and 1593 AM in Christchurch. The Wolf was available nationwide on the Sky Television digital service.

Low power and amateur
Low power broadcasting licenses in New Zealand are issued by Radio Spectrum Management and managed by the Ministry of Business, Innovation and Employment. In many cases, they provide community groups with easy access to broadcasting. Any resident is allowed a free licence at a maximum of 1 watt EIRP in the FM guardbands from 87.6 to 88.3 and from 106.7 to 107.7 MHz under a General User Radio License (GURL).  Prior to June 2010, the lower band was located between 88.1 and 88.8 and a maximum of 500 mW EIRP allowed. Broadcasters on these frequencies are required to cease operations if they interfere with other, licensed broadcasters and have no protection from interference from other licensed or unlicensed broadcasters. Contact details must also be broadcast every hour.

One licensee may operate two transmitters anywhere (close together), but a third transmitter must be at least 25 km away from at least one of the first two transmitters. Radio Inspectors regularly monitor and make random unannounced visits to broadcasters, and will impose fines for violations of the regulations. New broadcasters are also subject to an initial compulsory inspection. The high cost of frequencies in Auckland, Wellington and Christchurch makes low-power broadcasting particularly popular in these markets.

Radio markets

Radio stations in New Zealand include some network stations and a number of predominantly low-power stations that operate in a single market. Auckland, Wellington and Christchurch are the largest commercial radio markets, surveyed twice a year by GfK New Zealand in March and August/September. Between 1991 and 2015, the survey was conducted by TNS New Zealand. Smaller markets like Waikato are surveyed once a year in the second August research term, while several others use other means to measure audience share.

Radio New Zealand networks do not participate in commercial market surveys, meaning they are not included in listener numbers and are not counted in market share. However, a Nielsen Media Research survey commissioned by Radio New Zealand suggests its National and Concert stations reach a combined audience of 563 thousand unique listeners. The National programme reaches 503 thousand, or 14 percent of the 15+ population, giving it 10.2 percent station share. The Concert programme reaches 138 thousand or 4 percent of the 15+ population, with an estimated market share of 1.4 percent. Commercial radio surveys, by comparison, are based on listeners 10+.

Auckland

Auckland is the country's largest radio market. Surveys of 3000 people are conducted twice a year to garner the listener habits of more than 1.2 million people who live in Auckland's urban centres. Due in part to high levels of peak hour commuter traffic congestion, 74.6 percent listen to the radio on a weekly basis. Newstalk ZB has maintained a long-running first place in the ratings under successive breakfast hosts Paul Holmes and Mike Hosking, with a 13.4 percent station share and a weekly cumulative audience of 178 thousand listeners in the latest Q2-14 survey for August to September 2014.

The Edge has 7.7 percent share and 169.2 thousand listeners; ZM has 4.5 percent share and 136.9 thousand listeners; The Breeze has 7.8 percent share and 136.2 thousand listeners; Mai FM has 5.2 percent share and 126.2 thousand listeners; and Coast has 7.8 percent share and 105.4 thousand listeners. Radio Live, The Hits, The Sound, The Rock, George FM, More FM, Flava and Radio Hauraki all maintain audiences over 50 thousand. Radio Sport, the BBC World Service and Hindi station Radio Tarana also have audiences above 30 thousand.

Wellington

The Wellington market covers an area of around 335 thousand people, where 64.1 percent of people listen to commercial radio during the week. A survey of around 1500 people is conducted in the market twice a year. Despite the absence of former local breakfast duo Polly and Grant, ZM continues to lead the ratings with around 42 thousand listeners each week and 6.7 percent market share.

Newstalk ZB has local news and a local morning programme, has the highest market share at 14.5 percent, and has around 34 thousand listeners. Long-running and predominantly local station The Breeze has 12.7 percent station share and over 38 thousand listeners. The Hits and The Edge also have more than 30 thousand listeners and more than 7 percent market share.

Christchurch

Around 1500 people are surveyed for the Christchurch market, in which 72.8 percent of the population of 365 thousand people are radio listeners. Under breakfast hosts Simon Barnett and Gary McCormick, More FM consistently leads the ratings with around 70 thousand listeners. Newstalk ZB maintains the highest market share at 15.3 percent, with nearly 56 thousand listeners. Its local news and morning programme provide a particular focus on the issues that have followed the 2010 Canterbury earthquake.

The Breeze has 57 thousand listeners and 9.9 percent station share; The Sound has 44 thousand listeners and 9.1 percent station share; and The Edge, The Rock and ZM also have more than 30 thousand listeners and more than 3 percent station share.

Other survey markets

New Zealand's provincial radio markets are surveyed once a year in August and September, with survey sizes of 800 to 1000 people. The largest of these is the Waikato market, in which there are 227 thousand people and 79.7 percent of people listen to the radio each week. Locally founded The Edge has the most listeners at 47 thousand, followed by ZM with 44 thousand listeners. Partly local The Hits has 12.2 percent market share and 33 thousand listeners, just ahead of locally founded The Rock with 12.1 percent market share and 32 thousand listeners.

Three other markets also cover the upper North Island. Northland covers 112 thousand people, with More FM reaching 27 thousand listeners and 17.3 percent market share. Tauranga covers 136 thousand people, with Coast reaching 23 thousand listeners and 15 percent market share. Only 47 thousand people live in the Rotorua market, where Flava leads with 8 thousand listeners and Coast has 16.6 percent market share.

In the central North Island, Taranaki includes a population of 84 thousand people, with The Edge attracting 21 thousand listeners and The Hits securing 13.8 percent market share. The Hawke's Bay market includes 107 thousand people, with 23 thousand listeners tuning into The Edge and Newstalk ZB maintaining 15.6 percent market share. Manawatu has a radio market of 97 thousand, with 18 thousand listening The Edge and 15 percent of market share going to The Rock.

On the South Island, the Nelson market includes 61 thousand people, with 15 thousand people listening to The Edge and 15 percent of market share going to Coast. Dunedin includes 102 thousand people, with 19 thousand listening to The Edge, 16 thousand listening to The Hits and Radio Dunedin maintaining a 14.8 percent market share. Southland covers 68 thousand people, including 14 thousand listening to The Edge. Market share is heavily contested with Coast securing around 16.5 percent and The Rock securing 15 percent.

Non-survey markets

There are several radio markets that are not recognised by commercial surveys, but in which there is still competition between commercial radio stations such as Newstalk ZB. These include Tokoroa and Taupo in the Waikato and the Kapiti Coast in Wellington. Others include Blenheim in Marlborough, Greymouth on the West Coast, Ashburton and Timaru in Canterbury, and Oamaru, Alexandra, and Queenstown in Otago.

See also
List of radio stations in New Zealand
List of New Zealand radio station callsigns

References

 
1922 establishments in New Zealand